Shin Mauk was a principal queen consort of King Narathihapate of the Pagan Dynasty of Burma (Myanmar). She was the mother of Thihathu of Prome, and a maternal great grandmother of King Swa Saw Ke of Ava.

References

Bibliography
 

Queens consort of Pagan